DWIS (106.7 FM), broadcasting as 106.7 Radyo Natin, is a radio station owned and operated by Manila Broadcasting Company. Its studios are located along T. Asper St., Agoo.

References

Radio stations in La Union
Radio stations established in 2002